Abysmal is the seventh studio album by American melodic death metal band The Black Dahlia Murder. It was released on September 18, 2015 through Metal Blade Records. It was produced by Mark Lewis, who also produced The Black Dahlia Murder's albums Deflorate and Ritual, and the band's former bassist Ryan Williams, who also produced their preceding album Everblack. It is the band's final album to feature guitarist Ryan Knight before his departure in February 2016, and return in 2022.

Track listing

Personnel
The Black Dahlia Murder
 Trevor Strnad – lead vocals
 Brian Eschbach – guitars, backing vocals
 Ryan Knight – guitars
 Max Lavelle – bass
 Alan Cassidy – drums

Additional personnel
 Mitch McGugan - violin
 Rhianon Lock and Rachel Dawson - cello
 Bertie Anderson - classical vocals on "Vlad, Son of the Dragon"
 Ryan McCullough - MIDI voicings

Production
 The Black Dahlia Murder – production
 Mark Lewis – recording, engineering, mixing, mastering
 Ryan "Bart" Williams – recording, engineering
 Daemorph – artwork

Charts

References 

2015 albums
The Black Dahlia Murder (band) albums
Metal Blade Records albums
Albums produced by Mark Lewis (music producer)